An election to Dublin Corporation took place in March 1902 as part of that year's Irish local elections. The election saw a small decline in Labour representation, whilst the Nationalists continued their dominance of the council.

Since the last election the rifts between the United Irish League and the Irish National League had been healed, with the two groups reuniting.

Council composition following election

Ward results

Arran Quay

Alderman

Councillor

Clontarf East

Clontarf West

Drumcondra Ward

Fitzwilliam Ward

Glasnevin

Inns Quay Ward

Alderman

Councillor

Mansion House Ward

Mountjoy Ward

New Kilmainham

North City Ward

Alderman

Councillor

North Dock

Alderman

Councillor

Royal Exchange Ward

South City Ward

Wood Quay Ward

References

1902 Irish local elections
1902